Talleyrand Township is a township in Wilson County, Kansas, United States.

History
Talleyrand Township was established in 1871. It may be named for Charles Maurice de Talleyrand-Périgord.

References

Townships in Wilson County, Kansas
Townships in Kansas